The sport of football in the country of Papua New Guinea is run by the Papua New Guinea Football Association. The association has been affiliated with FIFA and the Oceania Football Confederation since 1966.  The association administers national football and futsal teams, as well as the national league. Football is the most popular sport together with rugby league in Papua New Guinea.

In 2016 PNG hosted the U-20 Women's World Cup.

League system

Top clubs from PNG participate in the Oceania Champions League including in 2009-10 when Hekari United won that competition and went on to represent Oceania at the 2010 FIFA Club World Cup.

Champions

Women's football

Women's football is a minority pursuit in the country.

See also

References